Bhalewadi is a village in the Karmala taluka of Solapur district in Maharashtra state, India.

Demographics
Covering  and comprising 192 households at the time of the 2011 census of India, Bhalewadi had a population of 1094. There were 572 males and 522 females, with 148 people being aged six or younger.

References

Villages in Karmala taluka